The Sulawesi dwarf kingfisher (Ceyx fallax) is a species of bird in the family Alcedinidae that is endemic to Sulawesi island, Indonesia. The species has numerous common names such as Celebes forest kingfisher, blue-crowned kingfisher, Celebes dwarf-kingfisher, and Celebes pygmy-kingfisher.

Its natural habitat is subtropical or tropical dry forests. It is threatened by habitat loss.

References

Birds described in 1866
Endemic birds of Sulawesi
Ceyx (bird)
Taxonomy articles created by Polbot